2023 World Cup may refer to:

 2023 FIBA Under-19 Basketball World Cup
 2023 FIFA Beach Soccer World Cup
 2023 FIFA U-20 World Cup
 2023 FIFA U-17 World Cup
 2023 Cricket World Cup
 2023 Men's FIH Hockey World Cup, in field hockey 
 2023 FIFA Women's World Cup, in association football 
 2023 Netball World Cup
 2023 Rugby World Cup, in rugby union 
 2023 FIBA Basketball World Cup